El Shenawy (in Arabic الشناوي) is an Arabic surname and may refer to:

Ahmed El Shenawy (born 1991), Egyptian footballer 
Mohamed El Shenawy (born 1988), Egyptian footballer